Jacob Raphael Druckman (June 26, 1928 – May 24, 1996) was an American composer born in Philadelphia.

Life 
A graduate of the Juilliard School in 1956, Druckman studied with Vincent Persichetti, Peter Mennin, and Bernard Wagenaar. In 1949 and 1950 he studied with Aaron Copland at Tanglewood and later continued his studies at the École Normale de Musique in Paris (1954–55). He worked extensively with electronic music, in addition to a number of works for orchestra or for small ensembles. In 1972 he won the Pulitzer Prize for his first large orchestral work, Windows. He was composer-in-residence of the New York Philharmonic from 1982 until 1985. Druckman taught at Juilliard, The Aspen Music Festival, Tanglewood, Brooklyn College, Bard College, and Yale University, among other appointments. He is Connecticut's State Composer Laureate.

Druckman died of lung cancer at age 67 in New Haven, Connecticut. His music is published by Boosey & Hawkes. He is the father of percussionist Daniel Druckman.

The Aspen Music Festival gives out the Jacob Druckman award in his honor each festival season. The reward is given to an up-and-coming composer, who is then commissioned to write a piece to be performed in the next festival season, offering a chance for this new composer to show his or her talents.

Notable musicians who have recorded his works include David Zinman, Wolfgang Sawallisch, Zubin Mehta, Leonard Slatkin, Dawn Upshaw, Jan DeGaetani, Dorian Wind Quintet, the Orpheus Chamber Orchestra, and the American Brass Quintet.

Notable students

Major works

 String Quartet No. 1 (1948)
The Seven Deadly Sins (1955), for piano
Dark Upon the Harp (1961–1962), for mezzo-soprano, brass, and percussion. Setting of texts from the Biblical Psalms.
 String Quartet No. 2 (1966)
Animus I (1966–1967), for trombone and electronic tape
Animus II (1967–1968), for mezzo-soprano, percussion and electronic tape
Animus III (1968), for clarinet and electronic tape
Incenters (1968), for 13 Instruments
Valentine (1969), for solo contrabass
Synapse (1971), for tape
Windows (1972), for orchestra
Delizie Contente Che l'Alme Beate After Cavalli (1973), for wind quintet and tape
Lamia (1975), for mezzo-soprano and orchestra. "The texts," according to the composer, "range from the most terrifying damnings of ancient witches to the most innocent folkloric dream-conjuration of provincial maidens."
Other Voices (1976), for brass quintet
Aureole (1979), for orchestra
Prism (1980), for orchestra
 String Quartet No. 3 (1981)
Vox Humana (1983), for chorus and orchestra
Reflections on the Nature of Water (1986), for solo marimba
Brangle (1988–1989), for orchestra
Antiphonies, for two choruses; setting of poems by Gerard Manley Hopkins.
Nor Spell Nor Charm (1990), for chamber orchestra
Summer Lightning (1991), for orchestra
Seraphic Games (1992), for orchestra
Counterpoise (1994), for soprano and orchestra

References

Further reading
 Clarkson, Austin, and Steven Johnson. 2001. "Druckman, Jacob Raphael". The New Grove Dictionary of Music and Musicians, second edition, edited by Stanley Sadie and John Tyrrell. London: Macmillan Publishers.
 Griffiths, Paul. 2002. "Druckman, Jacob". The Oxford Companion to Music, edited by Alison Latham. Oxford and New York: Oxford University Press.

External links
The Jacob Druckman Papers, the composer's personal papers and manuscripts, are housed in the Music Division of The New York Public Library for the Performing Arts.
Biography at Boosey and Hawkes Publisher
Jacob Druckman at the Avant Garde Project has FLAC files made from high-quality LP transcriptions of out-of-print vocal, instrumental, and electroacoustic works by Druckman available for free download.
Interview with Jacob Druckman, March 22, 1989

1928 births
1996 deaths
20th-century classical composers
20th-century American composers
American classical composers
American male classical composers
Jewish classical musicians
Jewish American classical composers
Musicians from Philadelphia
Nonesuch Records artists
Aspen Music Festival and School faculty
Bard College faculty
École Normale de Musique de Paris alumni
Pulitzer Prize for Music winners
Pupils of Aaron Copland
Symbols of Connecticut
Deaths from lung cancer
20th-century American male musicians